Gino Soccio (born September 9, 1955) is a Canadian disco record producer  based in Montreal. His only US Billboard Hot 100 entry was the #48 hit single "Dancer" in 1979, but he did hit #1 on the US Hot Dance Music/Club Play chart twice ("Dancer" / "Dance to Dance" in 1979, and "Try It Out" / "Hold Tight" in 1981, six weeks each). "Dancer" peaked at #46 in the UK Singles Chart in May 1979. Soccio's third biggest hit, "It's Alright" / "Look at Yourself", from his album, Face to Face, reached #2 for 5 weeks also on the Hot Dance Music/Club Play chart. "Turn It Around" was released only as a single in 1984.

Biography

Early life
Soccio was born in Verdun, Quebec, of Italian descent. Soccio told Wax Poetics in 2013 that he started playing piano at eight and was playing Bach sonatas by eleven. In the early 1970s, he was influenced by electronic musicians Kraftwerk, Stockhausen, and Wendy Carlos and started renting synths, becoming a sought-after Montreal keyboard specialist.

Career
Soccio got his start in disco when Montreal producer Pat Deserio called him in 1975 and asked if he would play keyboards and help compose for the Kebekelektrik album. Prior to this, Soccio was working as a local session musician.

Deserio asked Soccio to make a disco version of Ravel's "Bolero," which he wanted to release with filler tracks under the fictitious act name Kebekelektrik, a Kraftwerk-influenced misspelling of "Quebec Electric." In reality, Soccio played every note. "It was very labor-intensive," Soccio later said, "but at the same time, I had free rein of the entire studio, which had never happened [before]. It was a really great learning experience. I had never done disco. As you're going along doing it, you fall right in love with it." The Kebekelektrik sessions produced B-side "War Dance," described by Wax Poetics' Jered Stuffco as "an orgy of analog squirts and electronic flourishes that Soccio wrote and recorded on the spot, warts and all."

The four-song LP Kebekelektrik was remixed by Tom Moulton and released in the U.S. on Salsoul in 1978.

The Kebekelektrik album helped to launch Soccio's career, as his composition "War Dance" became a hit on U.S. dance floors, a song Soccio himself had deemed "filler". In Canada, the Kebekelektrik song "Magic Fly" reached number 69 on the pop charts, October 8, 1977.

In 1978 Soccio released a dance single, "The Visitors", which was later remixed by Ouimet. That year he also played keyboards on the Bombers album Bombers.

His debut solo album "Outline" was released in 1979 and contained the hit "Dancer"; the album received critical acclaim and brought him international recognition.

In 1979, Soccio also recorded a disco album with Guy Lafleur which cost CAD$100 000 to produce.

In the UK he received airplay from Robbie Vincent on BBC Radio London, and Greg Edwards on Capital Radio on imported RFC Records, a subsidiary of Warner Bros. Records.

He also assembled and produced the disco studio group, Witch Queen, best known for their hit, "Bang a Gong" / "All Right Now" (1979). It peaked at number eight on the US Hot Dance/Disco chart.

Discography

The discography of Gino Soccio consists of four studio albums, three compilations and seventeen singles.

Studio albums

Compilation albums
Remember (1984, Celebration)
Greatest Hits (1989, Unidisc)
The Best of Gino Soccio (1994, Unidisc)

Singles

Notes

A"Human Nature" actually charted at #50 on Billboard Dance/Electronic Singles Sales chart.

See also
 List of number-one dance hits (United States)
 List of artists who reached number one on the US Dance chart

References

External links
 
 

1955 births
Living people
Canadian dance musicians
Canadian disco musicians
Canadian record producers
Canadian keyboardists
Canadian people of Italian descent
Musicians from Montreal
People from Verdun, Quebec